Hugh Motley 'Pud' Thurlow (10 January 1903 – 3 December 1975) was an Australian cricketer who played in one Test in 1932. He was born in Townsville, Queensland.

'Pud' was called up for the fourth match against South Africa in Adelaide in 1931–32, which Australia won, and never played for his country again. He opened the bowling twice and finished with 0-86 for the match, perhaps no disgrace considering Clarrie Grimmett and Bill O'Reilly shared 18 wickets on a spin-friendly deck.

Thurlow batted once and was run out for a duck, but considering he was a No.11 this hardly seemed a crime worthy of lifetime banishment from the team. Scroll up the scoresheet, however, and the mystery becomes clearer: Don Bradman was the man stranded at the far end ... not out 299.

Thurlow died in Rosalie, Queensland, aged 72.

References

1903 births
1975 deaths
Australia Test cricketers
Queensland cricketers
Australian cricketers
People from Townsville